BOHD (4-methyl-2,5-dimethoxy-beta-hydroxyphenethylamine) is a lesser-known psychedelic drug.  It is the beta-hydroxy derivative of 2C-D. BOHD was first synthesized by Alexander Shulgin. In his book PiHKAL, the minimum dosage is listed as 50 mg, and the duration unknown.  BOHD produces a marked drop in blood pressure. Very little data exists about the pharmacological properties, metabolism, and toxicity of BOHD.

Legality

United Kingdom
This substance is a Class A drug in the Drugs controlled by the UK Misuse of Drugs Act.

United States
In the U.S., this substance is a Schedule 1 isomer of Mescaline.

See also 
 BOB
 BOD
 BOH
 Phenethylamine
 Psychedelics, dissociatives and deliriants

References 

Psychedelic phenethylamines
Phenylethanolamines